Poběžovice (until 1945 Ronšperk) is a town in Domažlice District in the Plzeň Region of the Czech Republic. It has about 1,500 inhabitants. The historic town centre is well preserved and is protected by law as an urban monument zone.

Administrative parts
Villages of Ohnišťovice, Sedlec, Sezemín, Šibanov, Šitboř and Zámělíč are administrative parts of Poběžovice. Sezemín and Šibanov form an exclave of the municipal territory.

Geography
It lies in the Upper Palatine Forest Foothills. The Pivoňka stream flows through the town.

History

The continuous settlement of the area is documented by archaeological finds from the 11th century. The village of Poběžovice was probably founded at the beginning of the 14th century. The first written mention of Poběžovice is from 1359, when a small fortress was built. In 1424, it became a market town.

In 1459, the market town was bought by the lower nobleman Dobrohost of Drštka by Skořice. At the latest in 1470, he left the fortress and had built a late Gothic solid water castle called Nový Ronšperk ("New Ronšperk"). Since then he was known as Dobrohost of Ronšperk, and Poběžovice was renamed Ronšperk. In 1490–1501 he also had built a new large church, the Church of the Assumption of the Virgin Mary, where he was later buried. In 1506, Ronšperk became a town.

In 1864, the castle and the estate were bought by the Coudenhove noble family, later known as Coudenhove-Kalergi family.

Demographics

Sights

The Poběžovice Castle (formerly Ronšperk Castle) is one of two main landmarks of the town. The medieval late Gothic castle from the end of the 15th century was rebuilt in the Baroque style in 1675. The castle park was founded in 1844. In 1863, the castle was completely reconstructed. In the second half of the 20th century, it gradually fell into disrepair again. The castle is permanently closed due to its poor condition, but in 2020 gradual repairs are planned and the aim is to open it to the public.

The Church of the Assumption of the Virgin Mary was built in the late Gothic style in 1490. It was rebuilt into its current early Baroque form in the third quarter of the 17th century.

Notable people
Bezalel Ronsburg (1760–1820), Talmudist and rabbi
Moses Löb Bloch (1815–1909), Hungarian rabbi
Carl Holzmann (1849–1914), Austrian architect
Mitsuko Aoyama (1874–1941), Japanese countess, lived here
Emil Starkenstein (1884–1942), pharmacologist
Lilly Steinschneider (1891–1975), first Hungarian woman to qualify as a pilot, lived here
Richard von Coudenhove-Kalergi (1894–1972), Austrian-Japanese politician and philosopher
Ida Friederike Görres (1901–1971), Austrian writer

Twin towns – sister cities

Poběžovice is twinned with:
 Schönsee, Germany

Gallery

References

External links

Cities and towns in the Czech Republic
Populated places in Domažlice District